Saim Bugay (1934–2008) was a Turkish sculptor.

Life

Early life and education
He was born in 1934 in Mersin, Turkey. He attended the Istanbul State Fine Arts Academy from 1962 to 1967 and was educated in the studio of Şadi Çalık.

Building experience in Europe
Between 1969 and 1975 he traveled though Europe and took this opportunity to study and examine wood sculpture in the different countries he visited. In France on a state scholarship he ha master classes on tree sculptures.

Teaching
He taught at the Istanbul State Fine Arts Academy from 1975 till he retired in 2002.

Death
He died in 2008 in Istanbul and was buried in the Zincirlikuyu Cemetery.

Works
His first abstract sculptures which he made from working iron. In his tree sculptures he showed importance to a symmetric fetish or emblem. He conveyed different messages in his sculptures. He is considered to be one of the successful representatives of the middle class in this field.

His works can be found in the İstanbul State Art and Sculpture Museum as well as in private collections in Turkey and abroad.

Some of his works include
Uzay (1967), İstanbul State Art and Sculpture Museum
Güneş (1968), İstanbul State Art and Sculpture Museum
Sazçalan (1968), İstanbul State Art and Sculpture Museum
Güneş 21 (1970), France
Çocuklar (1983)

Exhibitions
He had 10 personal exhibitions. Seven were in France and three were in Turkey. He also participated in collaborative exhibitions.

Awards
In 1969 he won the first place award in the sculpture division of State Painting and Sculpture Exhibition.

Sources

References

Burials at Zincirlikuyu Cemetery
1934 births
Academy of Fine Arts in Istanbul alumni
Turkish male sculptors
Academic staff of Mimar Sinan Fine Arts University
2008 deaths
People from Mersin